Thomas Francis Dermot Pakenham, 8th Earl of Longford (born 14 August 1933), known simply as Thomas Pakenham, is an Anglo-Irish historian and arborist who has written several prize-winning books on the diverse subjects of African history, Victorian and post-Victorian British history, and trees.

Background
Pakenham is the eldest son of the 7th Earl of Longford, a Labour government minister, and the author Elizabeth Longford.

He has seven siblings, among them the award-winning historian and biographer Lady Antonia Fraser (who is the widow of playwright Harold Pinter); Lady Rachel Billington, also a writer (and the widow of the director Kevin Billington); Lady Judith Kazantzis, a poet; and The Hon. Kevin Pakenham, who worked in the City of London. He is also a cousin of the former Labour deputy leader Harriet Harman.

Thomas Pakenham does not use his title of Earl of Longford and before succeeding his father did not use his courtesy title. However, he has not disclaimed his British titles of Baron Silchester and Baron Pakenham under the Peerage Act 1963, and his Irish earldom cannot be disclaimed, as it is not covered by the Act. 

Following the House of Lords Act 1999 he is not entitled, as a hereditary peer, to sit in the House of Lords. His father was created a life peer in addition to his hereditary titles in order to be able to retain his seat in the upper house.

Family
In 1964 Pakenham married Valerie Susan McNair Scott, daughter of Major Ronald Guthrie McNair Scott and the Hon. Mary Cecilia Berry, daughter of William Berry, 1st Viscount Camrose. They have four children:

 Lady Anna Maria Pakenham, b. 26 July 1965 
 Lady Eliza Pakenham, b. 3 November 1966 
 Edward Melchior Pakenham, Lord Silchester, b. 6 January 1970. Lord Silchester is usually known as Ned Silchester or Ned Pakenham
 The Hon. Frederick Augustus Pakenham, b. 27 November 1971

Valerie Pakenham died on 22 January 2023 at the age of 83.

Biography
Pakenham was educated at Belvedere College, a secondary school in Dublin, and Magdalen College, Oxford. After graduating in 1955 he travelled around Ethiopia, a journey that he described in his first book, The Mountains of Rasselas (1959). After returning to Britain he worked on the editorial staff of the Times Educational Supplement, and later for The Sunday Telegraph and The Observer. He now divides his time between London and County Westmeath, Ireland, where he is the Chairman of the Irish Tree Society and honorary custodian of Tullynally Castle.

Pakenham owned Longford Greyhound Stadium until 1966, when he sold it to Longford Sports Ltd.

Bibliography 
The Mountains of Rasselas: Ethiopian Adventure (1959) 
The Boer War (1979) (winner of The Cheltenham Prize)
The Scramble for Africa (1991)(winner of the WH Smith Literary Award and the Alan Paton Award)
The Year of Liberty: The History of the Great Irish Rebellion of 1798 (1993)
Meetings with Remarkable Trees (1996) (made into a radio series and a television series under the same title)
Remarkable Trees of the World (2002)
Remarkable Baobab (2004)
The Company of Trees: A Year in a Lifetime's Quest (2015)

References

External link
Tullynally Castle

1933 births
20th-century Irish people
21st-century Irish people
Alumni of Magdalen College, Oxford
Living people
English historians
20th-century Irish historians
British writers
Arborists
English Roman Catholics
Converts to Roman Catholicism
Thomas
People educated at Belvedere College
8
People in greyhound racing
Sons of life peers